; (January 10, 1829 – November 11, 1886) was a Japanese samurai of the late Edo period who served as daimyō of the Funai Domain (Bungo Province, 21,000 koku). Served in a variety of positions in the Tokugawa Shogunate, including that of wakadoshiyori. Resigning from the family headship in 1871, he went into retirement.

External links
Genealogy of the Matsudaira of Funai

1829 births
1886 deaths
Samurai
Daimyo
Meiji Restoration
Wakadoshiyori
Hisamatsu-Matsudaira clan
Ogyū-Matsudaira clan